This article lists the confirmed squads for the 2016 Men's Hockey Junior World Cup tournament held in Lucknow, India between 8 and 18 December 2016. The eight national teams were required to register a playing squad of eighteen players.

Pool A

Argentina
The following was the Argentina squad for the 2016 Junior World Cup.

Head coach: Mariano Ronconi

Australia
The following was the Australia squad for the 2016 Junior World Cup.

Head coach: Ben Bishop

Austria
The following was the Austria squad for the 2016 Junior World Cup.

Head coach:  Cedric D'Souza

South Korea
The following was the South Korea squad for the 2016 Junior World Cup.

Head coach: Jang Jung-min

Pool B

Belgium
The following was the Belgium squad for the 2016 Junior World Cup.

Head coach: Jeroen Baart

Egypt
The following was the Egypt squad for the 2016 Junior World Cup.

Head coach: Sayed El Bediwy

Malaysia
The following was the Malaysia squad for the 2016 Junior World Cup.

Head coach: Wallace Tan

Netherlands
The following was the Netherlands squad for the 2016 Junior World Cup.

Head coach: Eric Verboom

Pool C

Germany
The following was the Germany squad for the 2016 Junior World Cup.

Head coach: Valentin Altenburg

Japan
The following was the Japan squad for the 2016 Junior World Cup.

Head coach: Kyoichi Nagaya

New Zealand
The following was the New Zealand squad for the 2016 Junior World Cup.

Head coach: Bryce Collins

Spain
The following was the Spain squad for the 2016 Junior World Cup.

Head coach: Roger Pallarols

Pool D

Canada
The following was the Canada squad for the 2016 Junior World Cup.

Head coach: Indy Sehmbi

England
The following was the England squad for the 2016 Junior World Cup.

Head coach: Jon Bleby

India
The following was the India squad for the 2016 Junior World Cup.

Head coach: Harendra Singh

South Africa
The following was the South Africa squad for the 2016 Junior World Cup.

Head coach: Garreth Ewing

References 

Squads
Men's FIH Hockey Junior World Cup squads